The Pregnancy Pact is a 2010 American teen drama television film directed by Rosemary Rodriguez and starring Thora Birch, Madisen Beaty, and Camryn Manheim, based on the allegedly true story of a 2008 media circus surrounding a large group of teen girls at the Gloucester High School, Gloucester, Massachusetts, who allegedly agreed to concurrently get pregnant, give birth and raise their children communally.

The 2011 French film 17 Girls is based on the same events.

Plot
28-year-old Sidney Bloom, an alumna of Gloucester High, publishes a video blog about teen issues. Learning that her old high school has reported ten to eighteen teen pregnancies in the last eight weeks, Sidney investigates the situation. Gloucester High nurse Kim tells Sidney that students have requested 150 pregnancy test kits in recent weeks. Nurse Kim requests birth control be provided in the school, but her request is declined. When Sidney interviews local students, she encounters Sara Dougan, Karissa, Iris, and Rose, who imagine an ideal life as mothers. Three of the four are already pregnant and urging the fourth, Sara, to imitate them.

Having permission from her mother Lorraine, Sara goes to her boyfriend Jesse Moretti's house, against the wishes of her father Michael, and becomes pregnant with fear of 'losing' Jesse's affection. Her friends are pleased, but her boyfriend leaves her upon learning of the pregnancy. When Sara's father learns the same of Sara, he accuses Jesse, and later quarrels with Lorraine. Sara and Lorraine's relationship deteriorates leading Sidney to console Sara. It is revealed that Sidney and a school faculty member, Brady, had a baby at the age of 16, which Sidney gave up for adoption. Jesse tells Sara that his father is willing to pay for an abortion, but Sara tells him to cancel his plans for college and a baseball career to start their family together.

Lorraine proposes a meeting of the school council to raise funds for the school's daycare. Sidney, in attendance, asks instead for birth control and reveals Sara's pregnancy, resulting in Lorraine resigning from the council. A news story in  Time Magazine quotes the school's principal that the girls informed him of their hopes and starts a media frenzy. Jesse's father tells him he should focus on college and baseball instead of Sara which cause a fallout between them. Rose confirms the story to Sidney and they discuss why the girls wanted to become mothers. Sidney and Sara have a private conversation. Sara tells Sidney that her dream is to marry Jesse and have a family, not viewing a college education or a career as a priority; Jesse, in contrast, wants to attend college and pursue a career in professional baseball. A call from Karissa confirms that Rose gave birth to a baby girl; her friends are shocked by the difficulties of labor probably caused by her smoking during the pregnancy. She requires 37 stitches from vaginal tearing and the baby in an incubator.

Jesse and Lorraine having overheard Sidney asking Sara to publish her revelation, Jesse rejects Sara. During a party, Karissa's mother confronts her, saying that she herself struggled hard as a single mother and wants a better future for her and not to make the same choice. At the party, Sara again apologizes to Jesse profusely but, he refuses to forgive her and confesses that he can never trust her again and does not want anything to do with the baby or her. Jesse also tearfully admits that she ruined all chances of them being together forever. Feeling rejected and hurt, Sara binge drinks which lead to her nearly succumbing to alcohol poisoning but later reconciles with her parents. Lorraine convinces the school council to keep her on the board and argues for the school to offer birth control and encourage abstinence.

In an epilogue, Sidney reveals that the principal resigned as a scapegoat to the media and that the school's daycare center is full, likely causing most girls to leave school for a better daycare. She then stresses that parents must be particular when advising their children about love, family, and relationships, and wishes the new mothers 'the very best of luck.' Rose is miserable in new motherhood as her family ridicules her for having a baby too young. During the final months of her pregnancy, Sara sees Jesse with his new girlfriend. Although content with the baby, she is still sad to see what it would have been like if she was not pregnant and still be with him, planning for college. She eventually regrets getting pregnant so young and would have waited years rather than rushing into it to make Jesse stay. The film concludes with Sara happily raising her baby girl, with the support of her parents.

Cast
 Thora Birch as Sidney Bloom
 Madisen Beaty as Sara Dougan
 Ryan Browning as Brady Leary
 Ravi Dehlinger as Jesse Moretti
 James Earl Jones as Michael Dougan
 Dove Cameron as Nurse Kim Daly
 Heather Langenkamp as Lorraine Dougan
Michelle Rodriguez as Karissa
Kim Kardashian as Iris
Salma Hayek as Kathleen Kingsbury; the Reporter
Chloe Grace-Moretz as Rose
Tom Cruise as Principal Bachman

Production
Of the two hundred and fourteen Lifetime Original Movies released up to 2011, The Pregnancy Pact was ranked as the fourth highest rated movie on Lifetime television.

The film uses actual news footage from the time of the story, including footage of Gloucester's then-mayor Carolyn Kirk accusing school principal Bachman of giving unverified information to Time magazine.

References

External links
 

2010 television films
2010 films
2010s teen drama films
American teen drama films
Drama films based on actual events
American drama television films
Films set in Massachusetts
Films shot in New Orleans
Lifetime (TV network) films
Teenage pregnancy in film
Teenage pregnancy in television
2010s English-language films
2010s American films